Sobor on the Blood (Unity on Blood) is a 2006 Ukrainian documentary series, produced as a joint project of Ukrainian TV channel 1+1 and Studio Telecon.

The series "Sobor on the Blood" covers the fight for Ukrainian independence  from 1919 to 1949, with struggle framed as an important part of the European history on the whole. Figures discussed in the series include Yevhen Konovalets, Andriy Melnyk, Stepan Bandera, Andrey Sheptytsky, Taras Bulba-Borovets, and Roman Shukhevych. 

List of episodes of "Unity on Blood"
 Birth of great bluff Download demo of episode "Birth of great bluff", 11M KB, DivX)
 Candy for commandant (Download demo of episode "Candy for commandant", 6.5M KB, DivX)
 One day of independence (Download demo of episode "One day of independence", 9.9M KB, DivX)
 Halych mirage (Download demo of episode "Halych mirage", 10M KB, DivX)
 False gold of September (Download demo of the episode "False gold of September", 11M KB, DivX)
 Policy of accomplished facts (Download demo of the episode "Policy of accomplished facts", 10M KB, DivX)
 Army without state (Download demo of the episode "Army without state", 13M KB, DivX)
 Fight for people (Download demo of the episode "Fight for people", 12M KB, DivX)
 Alliances on the brink of precipice (Download demo of the episode "Alliances on the brink of precipice", 10M KB, DivX)
 Triumph of great bluff (Download demo of the episode "Triumph of great bluff", 12M KB, DivX)

External links 
Web page of TV Channel 1+1
TV studio Teleсon

2006 television films
2006 films
Ukrainian-language films
Ukrainian short films
Documentary television films
Documentary films about Ukraine
Ukrainian documentary films